Jaan Kalla (also Jaan Kala; 9 May 1889, in Ahja Parish (now Põlva Parish), Kreis Dorpat – ?) was an Estonian politician. He was a member of I Riigikogu, representing the Estonian Independent Socialist Workers' Party. He was a member of the Riigikogu since 10 March 1922. He replaced Hans Kruus. On 15 March 1922, he resigned his position and he was replaced by Karl Stallmeister.

References

1889 births
Year of death missing
People from Põlva Parish
People from Kreis Dorpat
Estonian Independent Socialist Workers' Party politicians
Members of the Riigikogu, 1920–1923